This is a Chinese name. The family name is Wang.

Wang Likun (born 22 March 1985), also known as Claudia Wang, is a Chinese actress and dancer. She is best known for her roles in television series Seven Swordsmen (2006), Beauty's Rival in Palace (2010), Beijing Youth (2012), Miss Assassin (2013), Qing Mang (2013), Twice Blooms the Flowers (2015); as well as the movies Ex-Files (2014) and Somewhere Only We Know (2015).

Early life 
Wang Likun was born on 22 March, in Chifeng, Inner Mongolia. Wang Likun is a Manchu, a Chinese ethnic minority. Wang Likun graduated from Beijing Dance Academy in 2004, majoring in traditional dance.

Career 
Wang Likun was discovered by famous Chinese director Tsui Hark, and shot her first television series Seven Swordsmen in 2004. She gained more recognition with her portrayal of three different roles in historical drama Beauty's Rival in Palace (2010). Wang also won the Acting Breakthrough award at the China TV Drama Awards for her performance as a mentally-ill patient in the popular youth series Beijing Youth (2012), and the Most Promising Actress award for her role as a wealthy girl in Barber (2013).

In 2015, Wang starred in the romantic film Somewhere Only We Know directed by Xu Jinglei. She won the Rising Star of Asia at 9th Asian Film Awards Special Awards Ceremony, Most Popular Actress at 22nd Beijing College Student Film Festival and Best Actress at 3rd China International Film Festival London for her performance.

In 2016, she was cast as the one of female leads in fantasy action drama Martial Universe, which stars Yang Yang as the main character.

In 2017, she featured in fantasy blockbuster Journey to the West: Conquering the Demons 2 produced by Stephen Chow and directed by Tsui Hark. The same year, she starred in the romantic comedy film Love is a Broadway Hit.

In 2019, Wang played Su Daji in the fantasy television series The Gods.

Filmography

Film

Television series

Variety show

Discography

Awards and nominations

References

External links 
 
 

Living people
Chinese film actresses
Chinese television actresses
21st-century Chinese actresses
People from Chifeng
Actresses from Inner Mongolia
Manchu actresses
Beijing Dance Academy alumni
Year of birth uncertain
The Amazing Race contestants
1985 births